Kazan'in Morokata (花山院師賢, 1301–1332) was a nobleman and poet of the Kamakura period. The son of Kazan'in Moronobu, he is enshrined at Komikado Shrine, a Shinto shrine located in Narita, Chiba Prefecture.

Among his children was Kazan'in Iekata.

References

External links
mention in biography of Kusunoki Masashige

1301 births
1332 deaths
People of Kamakura-period Japan
14th-century Japanese poets